Sakalar can refer to the following villages in Turkey:

 Sakalar, Artvin
 Sakalar, İnebolu